The Innocent is a 1985 John Mackenzie drama film, starring Andrew Hawley, Liam Neeson and Miranda Richardson, and is set in the Yorkshire Dales just after World War I. The film is about the struggles of a young Yorkshire boy trying to come to grips with squabbling parents, a doctor who wants to institutionalize him because of his epilepsy, and a mother who refuses to accept that he is different in any way. The film was produced by Tempest Films Ltd.

Cast
Andrew Hawley as Timothy 'Tim' Dobson
Kika Markham as Mrs. Dobson
Kate Foster as Win
Liam Neeson as John Carns
Patrick Daley as Eddie King
Paul Askew as Stanley
Lorraine Peters as Win's grandmother
Tom Bell as Frank Dobson
Richard Hope as Mouth organ player
Jack Carr as Mill owner
Clive Wood as Turner
Miranda Richardson as Mary Turner
Richard Laxton as Reg Reid
Denis Lill as Doctor
Alison Lloyd as Woolshop owner
Bill Rodgers as Drinksbearer

References

External links

Innocent, The
Innocent, The
1985 drama films
Films directed by John Mackenzie (film director)
1980s English-language films
1980s British films